Twinkle Echo is a studio album of Lo-fi music by Casiotone for the Painfully Alone. It was released in 2003 on Tomlab.

Track listing
"To My Mr. Smith" – 1:52
"Jeane, if You're Ever in Portland" – 2:28
"Toby, Take a Bow" – 1:59
"It Wasn't the Same Somehow" – 2:21
"Hey Eleanor" – 1:29
"Half Ghost" – 3:04
"Calloused Fingers Won't Make You Strong, Edith Wong" – 1:43
"Blue Corolla" – 2:03
"Casiotone for the Painfully Alone in a Yellow T-Shirt" – 2:18
"Students for Scarves & Charm" – 0:55
"Roberta C." – 3:45
"Attic Room" – 3:08
"Giant" – 2:10
"Twinkle Echo" – 0:39

Casiotone for the Painfully Alone albums
2003 albums